Hypsophrys is a small genus of cichlid fishes from Central America.

Species
There have been two recognized species in this genus:
 Hypsophrys nematopus (Günther, 1867) (Poor man's tropheus)
 Hypsophrys nicaraguensis (Günther, 1864) (Moga)

The poor man's tropheus had previously been considered to be in the separate monotypic genus Neetroplus before it was brought into Hypsophrys in 2007. However, genetic analysis by Oldřich Říčan, et al. in 2016 demonstrated that the poor man's tropheus should be in a separate genus and resurrected Neetroplus, restating the old scientific name Neetroplus nematopus.

References

 
Heroini
Fish of Central America
Cichlid genera
Taxa named by Louis Agassiz